Lois Green Schwoerer is an American historian of seventeenth century England and Elmer Louis Kayser Professor Emeritus of History at George Washington University.

She has contributed four articles to the Oxford Dictionary of National Biography.

Works
‘No Standing Armies’: Antiarmy Ideology in Seventeenth-century England (The Johns Hopkins University Press, 1974).
The Declaration of Rights, 1689 (The Johns Hopkins University Press, 1981).
Lady Rachel Russell: One of the Best of Women (The Johns Hopkins University Press, 1987).
‘The coronation of William and Mary, April 11, 1689’, in Lois G. Schwoerer (ed.), The Revolution of 1688-89: Changing Perspectives (Cambridge University Press, 1992), pp. 107–130.
'The Varieties of British Political Thought 1500-1800,' ed. J.G.A. Pocock; co-eds. Gordon J. Schochet and Lois G. Schwoerer (Cambridge: Cambridge University Press, 1994).
The Ingenious Mr. Henry Care, Restoration Publicist (The Johns Hopkins University Press, 2001).
Gun Culture in Early Modern England (Charlottesville: University of Virginia Press, 2016).

Notes

Living people
Year of birth missing (living people)
21st-century American historians
21st-century American biographers
American women historians
American women biographers
21st-century American women